Bradley Close (born 30 July 1998) is an Australian rules footballer who plays for the Geelong Cats in the Australian Football League (AFL). He was recruited by the Geelong Cats with the 14th pick in the 2019 rookie draft.

Early football
Close played local football for the North Gambier Football Club. He also played in the SANFL for the Glenelg Football Club in the 2019 season, where he kicked a total of 13 goals over 21 matches, while also winning the 2019 SANFL premiership

AFL career
Close debuted in Geelong's thirty-two point win over the Fremantle Dockers in the eighth round of the 2020 AFL season. Close kicked his first goal with his first kick just one minute into the game, also picking up 14 disposals, 3 marks and 4 tackles. Close took home the Best Young Player Award for the Geelong Football Club at the conclusion of the season. Close signed a contract extension with the Cats in November 2020. Geelong's general manager of football, Simon Lloyd, said "Brad also played well as a forward and we see him having a good future at AFL level. He will continue to develop his game through his strong drive and professionalism and we look forward to seeing Brad further enhance his game in 2021."

Statistics
Updated to the end of the 2022 season.

|-
| 2020 ||  || 45
| 8 || 2 || 2 || 29 || 41 || 70 || 13 || 24 || 0.3 || 0.3 || 3.6 || 5.1 || 8.8 || 1.6 || 3.0
|-
| 2021 ||  || 45
| 22 || 15 || 10 || 132 || 159 || 291 || 61 || 72 || 0.6 || 0.4 || 6.0 || 7.2 || 13.2 || 2.7 || 3.2 
|-
| scope=row bgcolor=F0E68C | 2022# ||  || 45
| 25 || 26 || 20 || 181 || 213 || 394 || 85 || 93 || 1.0 || 0.8 || 7.2 || 8.5 || 15.8 || 3.4 || 3.7
|- class=sortbottom
! colspan=3 | Career
! 55 !! 43 !! 32 !! 342 !! 413 !! 755 !! 159 !! 189 !! 0.8 !! 0.6 !! 6.2 !! 7.5 !! 13.7 !! 2.9 !! 3.4
|}

Honours and achievements

Team
AFL Premiership (Geelong): 2022
 McClelland Trophy: 2022

Individual
 Geelong F.C. Best Young Player Award: 2020

References

External links

1998 births
Living people
Geelong Football Club players
Geelong Football Club Premiership players
Glenelg Football Club players
Australian rules footballers from South Australia
One-time VFL/AFL Premiership players